Andrew Han Jingtao (born 26 July 1921 – 30 December 2020) was a Chinese Catholic clandestine Bishop of the Roman Catholic Diocese of Sipingjie since 1982 until his death in 2020.

Biography
Han was born in Jilin on July 26, 1921. Some documents record his birth year as 1919 or 1923. After studying, he was ordained a priest on December 14, 1947.

During the rule of Mao Zedong, he was arrested by the Communist government and sent to labor in labor camps. It was not until 1980, after Deng Xiaoping took power and became more open to religion, and he was released. He became a professor of Latin and Greek culture at Northeastern University in Changchun until he retired in 1987.

In 1982, he was secretly appointed as the Bishop of the Roman Catholic Diocese of Sipingjie. Four years later, his ordination was also silently held on May 6, 1986. He was a supporter of the Legions of Mary and founder of the Women's Congregation of Mount Calvary.

He was an underground bishop, but he repeatedly expressed his support for spiritual reconciliation between "underground church" and "open church" Catholics.

References

1921 births
2020 deaths
21st-century Roman Catholic bishops in China
People from Jilin
Chinese prisoners and detainees
Academic staff of the Northeastern University (China)
20th-century Roman Catholic bishops in China